The  is a dance fad created in Japan, based on the children's television series PythagoraSwitch which was broadcast on the educational channel of NHK, a Japanese non-profit public broadcasting service. It is performed by the comedy group Itsumo Kokokara with variable groups (it differs at each air) such as firefighters, soccer players, Yasugi-bushi preservation society, Vienna Boys' Choir, Blue Man Group, ninja and so on.

The basic steps are as follows, repeating as necessary:
 Bend knees, reach out straight with hands
 Lean back with arms akimbo ("big shot")
 Turn around, bow
 Face right, right hand horizon sweep
 Bend knees, breaststroke
 Bend down and pretend to pick up a chestnut from the ground
 Shake arms downwards, like pumping a bicycle tire
 Flap arms as though being inflated by a pump

The dance can be performed in lines, moving canon style one at a time. After each movement, the line takes a step forward.

Footnotes

External links 
 Algorithm March lyrics, in English and Japanese (Romaji). Note: this transcription contains some mistakes. For instance "susande" should be "susunde" (進んで）, a conjugated form of "susumu" (進む）which means to advance or move forward.
PythagoraSwitch official page (Japanese)
Official CD from Warner Music Japan (Japanese)
The CPDRC Dancing Inmates perform the Algorithm March
 A demonstration video is available in English and Japanese.

Novelty and fad dances
NHK